Local elections were held throughout Kosovo on 28 October 2000, organized by the Organization for Security and Co-operation in Europe (OSCE) and the United Nations Interim Administration Mission in Kosovo (UNMIK). This was the first local electoral cycle held in Kosovo after the start of the UNMIK mandate in 1999.

The 2000 local elections were held for municipal assemblies under a system of proportional representation. Once the municipal assemblies were constituted, the elected representatives in each jurisdiction selected an assembly president, who was recognized as having the rank of mayor. 

The Serb community of Kosovo generally boycotted the vote. Local Serb leaders expressed concern that security conditions had not improved to the point where Serbs could safely return to their homes; Dragiša Milović, acting as a spokesperson for Oliver Ivanović, said that Serbs in northern Kosovo would "[would] not register or take part in the vote until Serbs start returning to Kosovo in bigger numbers." A Council of Europe report indicated that Serb non-participation was the "main drawback of the elections," blaming the situation in part on "pressure brought to bear by Belgrade." The fall of Slobodan Milošević's government, which took place in the middle of the campaign, was described as occurring too late to effect any change in this situation.

Results

Mitrovica District

Leposavić

The results in Leposavić, a predominantly Serb community, were not certified due to low turnout. No Serb parties participated in the election.

Mitrovica

Faruk Spahija of the Democratic League of Kosovo was chosen as mayor after the election.

Skenderaj

Incumbent mayor Ramadan Gashi of the Democratic Party of Kosovo was confirmed for another term in office after the election.

Vushtrri

Incumbent mayor Xhemalj Pllani of the Democratic Party of Kosovo remained in office until 2001, when he was replaced by Hajzer Krasniqi of the Democratic League of Kosovo. Krasniqi was required to resign for health reasons in later in the year and was replaced by Muharrem Shabani, also of the Democratic League of Kosovo.

Zubin Potok

The results in Zubin Potok, a predominantly Serb community, were not certified due to low turnout. No Serb parties participated in the election.

Zvečan

The results in Zvečan, a predominantly Serb community, were not certified due to low turnout. No Serb parties participated in the election.

Source:

Subsequent developments
Following the results, and in light of the Serb boycott, UNMIK leader Bernard Kouchner indicated that he would appoint Serb representatives to councils in predominantly Serb areas. Objections were raised from some community leaders, including the serving mayors of Leposavić, Zubin Potok, Zvečan, and Kosovska Mitrovica (as chosen by the local assemblies elected in the 1996 Serbian local elections). Notwithstanding this, functional local administrations were established by UNMIK in the Serb communities.

Nenad Radosavljević, the leader of the Serbian National Council in Leposavić until his removal in mid-2000, became mayor in that community. He stood down from the role partway through his term. Online sources do not indicate if the position was filled; Nebojša Radulović served as deputy mayor and may have been acting mayor.

In Zubin Potok, Slaviša Ristić of the Democratic Party of Serbia was selected by the assembly as mayor.

Desimir Petković, who had served as mayor of Zvečan prior to the elections, was confirmed for another term in office afterwards.

Nikola Radović, the former mayor of Kosovska Mitrovica in the Serbian system, served as mayor in North Mitrovica for a time. In late 2002, control of the North Mitrovica municipal administration was handed over to UNMIK on a temporary basis.

References

Elections in Serbia
2000
Kosovo
2000 elections in Serbia
2000 in Kosovo
October 2000 events in Europe